Six Bullets is an independent short western film written and directed by Graham Killeen.  The film's narrative centers on a family torn apart by the work of an evil demon.  It was Killeen's directorial debut and is credited with earning him the "Best Local Filmmaker" award from the Milwaukee Newspaper Shepherd Express in 2006.  Signal Fire Films funded the film and is currently submitting it to the American film festival circuit.

Production 
The first draft of the script was completed by Killeen in Wisconsin in January 2004.  Various rewrites, preproduction meetings, and funding meetings took up the bulk of Killeen's time until filming began in earnest in May 2005 and concluded in November 2006.  Filming was primarily in Southeastern Wisconsin, but some second unit photography was completed in South Dakota and Minnesota.  The earliest versions of the film were audience tested in June 2006, after which the film was drastically re-edited and completed in February 2007.  Special visual effects were created by Little Fish Digital Studios in Wisconsin, and audio was completed by Brandaudio in Minnesota.

Cast
 Steven Koehler as Father
 Rachel Ogi as Daughter
 Amanda Shalhoub as Mother
 Lori Minnetti as Clown
 Donna Gawell-Mueller as Witch
 Ben Boyd as Twin #1
 Richard Sheski as Twin #2

Soundtrack and score 
The original score to Six Bullets was composed by the electronica band Endless Blue and produced by Nick Mitchell, with additional support and musicians from Minneapolis, Minnesota. The score explores the traditional "downtempo" feel of previous Endless Blue recordings, but is infused with less typical instruments, including acoustic guitar, Native American rhythm instruments, strings, and piano.  The soundtrack CD of the movie was released in April 2007.

Festivals and awards 

The film has been featured at a number of film festivals:

References

External links
 
 

American independent films
2007 short films
2007 films
Camcorder films
Films shot in Wisconsin
2007 directorial debut films
2007 independent films
2000s English-language films
2000s American films